The 1990 NCAA Rifle Championships were contested at the 10th annual competition to determine the team and individual national champions of NCAA co-ed collegiate rifle shooting in the United States. The championship was held at the Bancroft Hall Rifle Range at the United States Naval Academy in Annapolis, Maryland. 

West Virginia, with a team score of 6,205, once again retained the team championship, finishing 104 points ahead of hosts Navy. It was the Mountaineers third consecutive and sixth overall national title.

The individual champions were, for the smallbore rifle, Michelle Scarborough (South Florida), and Gary Hardy (West Virginia), for the air rifle.

Qualification
Since there is only one national collegiate championship for rifle shooting, all NCAA rifle programs (whether from Division I, Division II, or Division III) were eligible. A total of six teams ultimately contested this championship.

Results
Scoring:  The championship consisted of 120 shots by each competitor in smallbore and 40 shots per competitor in air rifle.

Team title

Individual events

References

NCAA Rifle Championship
NCAA Rifle Championships
1990 in shooting sports
NCAA Rifle Championships